The South African Railways Class 6G  of 1901 was a steam locomotive from the pre-Union era in the Cape of Good Hope.

In 1901, eight redesigned 6th Class  steam locomotives were placed in service by the Cape Government Railways. In 1912, when they were assimilated into the South African Railways, they were renumbered and designated .

Manufacturer
The original Cape 6th Class locomotive was designed at the Salt River works of the Cape Government Railways (CGR) in 1893, at the same time as the 7th Class.

Three new versions of the 6th Class locomotive entered service on the CGR in 1901, two American-built and one British-built. Of the two American-built versions, one was designed and built by the Schenectady Locomotive Works to the specifications of the CGR locomotive department. They were consequently somewhat different in appearance from the earlier Cape 6th Class locomotives. Eight locomotives were built and delivered, numbered in the range from 262 to 269 and allocated to the Western System.

Characteristics
While these engines were also built on bar frames like the previous two 6th Class versions, they were slightly larger, with larger boilers and with  diameter cylinders compared to the  diameter cylinders of all earlier 6th Class locomotives. Like the two Class 6F locomotives, a visually obvious distinguishing feature was their higher mounted running boards without the need for coupled wheel fairings.

The locomotive was equipped with Richardson balanced slide valves. The boiler barrel and the outside of the firebox were of Coatesville steel. The boiler feed was by two Cape pattern Gresham & Craven's no. 8 injectors, while the engine used Gresham & Craven's patent sanding gear and a Nathan no. 8 double sight feed cylinder lubricator. It had steam brakes on two pairs of coupled wheels, while the Type WE tender was equipped with a vacuum brake for itself and the train. The whistles were one  and one  Star Chime no. 3 types.

The firebox itself was of copper, with a rocking style firegrate and a hopper-type ash pan.

The smokebox was equipped with openings on its sides near the front, with covers which each had a handle by which it could be opened with a half turn to give direct access to the inside of the smokebox. This was most likely to facilitate cleaning of the spark arrestor screens to overcome clogging without having to open the smokebox door.

Class 6 sub-classes
When the Union of South Africa was established on 31 May 1910, the three Colonial government railways (CGR, Natal Government Railways and Central South African Railways) were united under a single administration to control and administer the railways, ports and harbours of the Union. Although the South African Railways and Harbours came into existence in 1910, the actual classification and renumbering of all the rolling stock of the three constituent railways were only implemented with effect from 1 January 1912.

When these eight locomotives were assimilated into the South African Railways (SAR) in 1912, they were renumbered in the range from 606 to 613 and designated Class 6G.

The rest of the CGR’s 6th Class locomotives, together with 6th Class locomotives which had been inherited from the Oranje-Vrijstaat Gouwerment-Spoorwegen (OVGS) via the Imperial Military Railways (IMR) and the Central South African Railways (CSAR), were grouped into thirteen more sub-classes by the SAR. The  locomotives became SAR Classes 6, 6A to 6F, 6H and 6J to 6L, the  locomotives became Class 6Y and the  locomotives became Class 6Z.

Service
The Class 6 series of locomotives were introduced primarily as passenger locomotives, but when the class became displaced by larger and more powerful locomotive classes, it literally became a Jack-of-all-trades. It went on to see service in all parts of the country, except in Natal, and was used on all types of traffic.

The Class 6G remained in service for sixty years, the last one being withdrawn from service at East London in 1961.

Illustration

References

1380
4-6-0 locomotives
2′C n2 locomotives
Schenectady Locomotive Works locomotives
Cape gauge railway locomotives
Railway locomotives introduced in 1901
1901 in South Africa
Scrapped locomotives